Clifton A. Hall (1826-1913) was an American architect from Providence, Rhode Island.

Biography
Hall was born in Boston to Charles G. Hall, an architect, who had come to Boston in 1820.  Hall first appears to have worked with architect George M. Dexter, and was the builder of Dexter's 1847-48 block of houses at 92-99 Beacon Street.  Hall afterwards entered the employ of his father's firm, C. G. & J. R. Hall.  He first came to Providence in 1850, to supervise the construction of that firm's What Cheer Block.

In 1855, he established a partnership with architect Alpheus C. Morse in the firm of Morse & Hall.  Their only known built commission is the Merchants Bank Building in Providence, as the firm only lasted for a few months.  He practiced alone until 1884, when he made Charles R. Makepeace partner, in the firm of Hall & Makepeace.  That firm was dissolved in 1886.  From then until his death, he practiced alone.  He was highly regarded in his lifetime as an architect of churches, private residences, and mills.

Architectural Works

Morse & Hall, 1855
 1855 - Merchants Bank Building, 20 Westminster St, Providence, Rhode Island
 1855 - Providence City Hall (Competition Entry), 25 Dorrance St, Providence, Rhode Island
 One of only two known competitors, the other being Thomas A. Tefft. Neither design was built.

Clifton A. Hall, 1855-1884
 1856 - Clifton A. Hall Duplex, 369-371 Broad St, Providence, Rhode Island
 Hall occupied 371 Broad until his death.
 1858 - St. John's Episcopal Church, 191 County Rd, Barrington, Rhode Island
 1859 - Emmanuel Episcopal Church at Brook Hill, 1214 Wilmer Ave, Richmond, Virginia
 1862 - Robert W. Haxall House, 513 E Grace St, Richmond, Virginia
 Demolished in 1926.
 1863 - Atlantic Mills, 118 Manton Ave, Olneyville, Rhode Island
 1863 - Elmwood Congregational Church, 353 Elmwood Ave, Providence, Rhode Island
 Demolished in 1914.
 1863 - Robert Knight House, 297 Elmwood Ave, Providence, Rhode Island
 Demolished.
 1863 - Pontiac Mills, Knight St, Pontiac, Rhode Island
 1864 - Gatehouse, Juniper Hill Cemetery, 24 Sherry Ave, Bristol, Rhode Island
 1864 - Trinity M. E. Church, 375 Broad St, Providence, Rhode Island
 1866 - St. John's Episcopal Church (Transepts), 271 N Main St, Providence, Rhode Island
 1866 - Charles A. Nichols House, Morris & Hazard Aves, Providence, Rhode Island
 Demolished in 1927, but the carriage house at 45 Hazard still stands.
 1866 - Thomas Goff House, 415 Angell St, Providence, Rhode Island
 1866 - William P. Vaughan Duplex, 182-184 Waterman St, Providence, Rhode Island
 1867 - Christ Episcopal Church, 909 Eddy St, Providence, Rhode Island
 Moved across Eddy in 1888 for the construction of the later church, and ultimately demolished.
 1867 - David G. Fales House (Remodeling), 476 High St, Central Falls, Rhode Island
 1867 - William R. Huston House, 309 Benefit St, Providence, Rhode Island
 1868 - Benjamin F. Greene House, 85 Cross St, Central Falls, Rhode Island
 1868 - Curry & Richards Building, 170 Westminster St, Providence, Rhode Island
 Demolished in 1900.
 1870 - Thurbers Avenue Primary School, 179 Thurbers Ave, Providence, Rhode Island
 Demolished.
 1872 - Providence Gas Co. Gasometer, Crary & Hospital Sts, Providence, Rhode Island
 Demolished.
 1873 - Point Street Grammar School, Plain, Point, & Grove Sts, Providence, Rhode Island
 Demolished for the construction of the interstate.
 1875 - Oxford Street Grammar School, 166 Oxford St, Providence, Rhode Island
 Demolished.
 1876 - Gate, Juniper Hill Cemetery, 24 Sherry Ave, Bristol, Rhode Island
 1880 - Slade Building, 44 Washington St, Providence, Rhode Island
 In an 1895 remodeling, Hall added the building's prominent tower.

Hall & Makepeace, 1884-1886
 1885 - St. John's Episcopal Church (Chapel), 191 County Rd, Barrington, Rhode Island
 1886 - Sanitary Gymnasium, 18 Aborn St, Providence, Rhode Island
 Demolished in 1896.

Clifton A. Hall, from 1886
 1888 - St. John's Episcopal Church (Tower), 191 County Rd, Barrington, Rhode Island
 1889 - Deutsche Hall, 155 Niagara St, Providence, Rhode Island
 Demolished.
 1895 - Arnold Building, 126 Washington St, Providence, Rhode Island
 1897 - Charles R. Makepeace House, 275 Wayland Ave, Providence, Rhode Island
 A house for Hall's former business partner, mill architect and engineer Charles R. Makepeace. Demolished c.2000.

References

19th-century American architects
1826 births
1913 deaths
Architects from Boston
Architects from Providence, Rhode Island